Long Sutton and Pitney railway station was a minor railway station situated in the hamlet of Upton, Somerset, about one mile equidistant from the two larger villages the station was named after.

The station was on the Langport and Castle Cary Railway of the Great Western Railway, and was situated around a mile west from Somerton Tunnel. While it closed in 1962, the line itself is still in use as part of the Reading to Taunton line.

The site is one option being considered in 2021 for a new station to serve the nearby towns of Langport and Somerton.

Services

References 

Disused railway stations in Somerset
Railway stations in Great Britain opened in 1907
Railway stations in Great Britain closed in 1962
Former Great Western Railway stations